Striatoguraleus thetis is a species of sea snail, a marine gastropod mollusk in the family Horaiclavidae.

Description
The length of the claviform shell attains 12 mm. The smooth protoconch consists of 1½-2 whorls. The teleoconch contains 5 whorls, convex from suture to suture (no concave sulcus). The suture is not distinctly crenulated, as in the other species in this genus. The sculpture consists of oblique opisthocline axial ribs, 11 on the first whorl, increasing to 12–13 on the body whorl, from suture to suture, and obsolescent on the base. The shell shows fine spiral striae 6–7 on the first whorl, increasing to about. 25 (between sutures) on the body whorl, crossing the ribs. No cingulum. The outer lip sinus is deep, with a thick, smooth parietal callus in the adult. The aperture is rather oblong. The straight columella is reflected at the short and broad siphonal canal. The color of the shell varies from white or lilac to orange.

Distribution
This marine species occurs off Jeffrey's Bay - Northeast Cape, South Africa

References

 Smith, Edgar A. (1904) . On a Collection of Marine Shells from Port Alfred, Cape Colony; Journal of Malacology, xi, p. 27, pi. 2, fig. 3 
 Kilburn, R. N. "Turridae (Mollusca: Gastropoda) of southern Africa and Mozambique. Part 7. Subfamily Crassispirinae, section 2." Annals of the Natal Museum 35.1 (1994): 177-228
 Steyn, D.G. & Lussi, M. (1998) Marine Shells of South Africa. An Illustrated Collector’s Guide to Beached Shells. Ekogilde Publishers, Hartebeespoort, South Africa, ii + 264 pp. page(s): 152

External links
  Tucker, J.K. 2004 Catalog of recent and fossil turrids (Mollusca: Gastropoda). Zootaxa 682:1-1295.

Endemic fauna of South Africa
thetis
Gastropods described in 1904